Area 3 can refer to:

 Area 3 (Nevada National Security Site)
 Postcentral gyrus, also known as Brodmann area 3